Acanthurus reversus is a tropical fish found in coral reefs in the Marquesas Islands. It was first named by Randall and Earle in 1999.

References

Acanthuridae
Acanthurus
Fish described in 1999